Riksteatern is the name of the popular "National Touring Theatre"/"National Theatre Company" (~Eng. transl.) in Sweden. It's the biggest theatre company on tour in Sweden and can, in one way, almost be described as Sweden's national stage on tour.

Riksteatern is financed and owned by 240 local economic associations throughout Sweden and the goal is to promote and produce quality theatre for all of Sweden, outside the city regions.

Riksteatern was established in 1933 and has been on-tour all over Sweden since. The Royal Dramatic Theatre (the national stage) and the Cullberg Ballet, for example, tours regularly with Riksteatern with many of their most popular productions.

History of Riksteatern
Riksteatern (or "the Riksteater") was established in 1933 by Arthur Engberg. "Not only the citizens of the capital city in Sweden should be granted the privilege of first class theatre productions. The rest of the nation also has the right to claim this!" - with these words, after a long public debate, Riksteatern was given the proper state funding and support. At first Riksteatern, in the 1930s, was supposed to be the touring section of Sweden's Royal Dramatic Theatre, in an effort to reach an audience in Sweden that couldn't get the chance to visit the national stage in Stockholm. However, in the 1940s Riksteatern was given their own ensemble, producing stage productions solely for Riksteatern and with the purpose to be given on-tour.

In 1966 Riksteatern was corporatized with Sweden's second influential touring theatre organization Svenska Teatern and became "Svenska Riksteatern". In 1967 Riksteatern started a section for producing theatre productions for children and youth, called Unga Riks ("Young Riksteatern") which has performed quality theatre for children for three decades, performing in schools all over Sweden at low cost on a regular bases.

Since 1977 the theatre group Riksteatern Crea, former Tyst Teater ("Silent Theatre"), is also part of Riksteatern. It's a unique group that specialize in staging theatre productions for deaf in the sign language and has become very popular and sought after internationally in recent years.

In 1999 "Riks Drama" was founded by Lars Norén, Sweden's leading contemporary playwright today, and also the section of "Riks Gästspel" for guest performances by Riksteatern abroad.

External links
Riksteatern.se (official site, in Swedish only)

External links
Riksteatern website

Further reading
Riksteaterns historia med citat 
 Riksteaterns historia 

Theatres in Sweden
Theatre companies in Sweden
Touring theatre